Guwahati–Ledo Intercity Express is an intercity train of the Indian Railways connecting  in Guwahati and Ledo on eastern end of Assam. It is currently being operated with 15603/15604 train numbers on a daily basis.

Service

The 15603/Guwahati–Ledo Intercity Express has an average speed of 40 km/hr and covers 578 km in 14 hrs 20 mins. 15604/Ledo–Guwahati Intercity Express has an average speed of 53 km/hr and covers 578 km in 14 hrs 35 mins.

Route and halts

Coach composition

The train consists of 13 coaches :

 1 AC II Tier
 1 AC III Tier
 4 Sleeper coaches
 3 Second Class sitting
 4 General
 1 Luggage/parcel van

Traction

Both trains are hauled by a New Guwahati shed's WDP-4D diesel locomotive.

External links 

15603/Guwahati–Ledo Intercity Express
 15604/Ledo–Guwahati Intercity Express

References 

Rail transport in Assam
Transport in Guwahati
Intercity Express (Indian Railways) trains